Air Vice Marshal Alexander Gray,  (8 September 1896 – 16 May 1980) was a senior Royal Air Force leader during the Second World War.

RAF career
Gray was commissioned into the 7th Battalion of the Princess Louise's (Argyll and Sutherland Highlanders) in 1915 having briefly served as a private soldier in the Highland Light Infantry in the early days of the First World War. He was appointed Officer Commanding No. 55 Squadron in December 1917. He went on to command No. 12 Squadron from 1923 and No. 7 Squadron from 1934 before becoming Deputy Director of Training at the Air Ministry in 1936.

During the Second World War he was Station Commander at RAF Manston becoming a group captain at Headquarters 9 (Fighter) Group in 1940. He continued his war service as Air Officer Commanding No. 223 (Composite) Group from 1942, Air Officer Commanding No. 224 Group from 1943 and Air Commander at Eastern Air Command from 1944. From February 1945 he was Director of Training at the Air Ministry. He was awarded the United States Distinguished Flying Cross for his service in the Second World War.

After the war he served as Air Officer Commanding AHQ Iraq before retiring in 1949.

References

|-

Royal Air Force air marshals
Royal Air Force personnel of World War II
1896 births
1980 deaths
Companions of the Order of the Bath
Recipients of the Military Cross
Argyll and Sutherland Highlanders officers
Royal Flying Corps officers
British Army personnel of World War I
Recipients of the Distinguished Flying Cross (United States)
Recipients of the Croix de Guerre 1914–1918 (France)